Elmo Alvin Maul (June 20, 1902 – March 16, 1974) was a professional football player in the National Football League. Maul made his debut in the NFL in 1926 with the Los Angeles Buccaneers. He played only one season in the league.

Notes

External links

1902 births
1974 deaths
American football fullbacks
Players of American football from California
Saint Mary's Gaels football players
Los Angeles Buccaneers players